Moehanga (also "Te Mahanga," "Mahanga," or "Moyhanger"), was a Māori man from the Ngāpuhi iwi, located on the northern end of New Zealand's North Island, and the first Māori to set foot on British soil in 1806.

Journey to London 
Moehanga was the first Māori to visit the United Kingdom. In 1806, a whaler, the HMS Ferret, was in the region. 

   
The account written by John Savage, who accompanied Moehanga to London, is instructive. Of Moehanga's departure, the following was written by John Savage:  "...I shall now add some account of his conduct upon and subsequently to his departure from his own country . Our sailing from the bay was, for several days, prevented by adverse winds, after Moyhanger and his friends had taken a formal leave of each other, during which time their visits were several times repeated. A day or two previously to our departure I had him equipped in European clothing; it was coarse, and such as is usually worn by sailors at sea...Moyhanger bore up against the last farewell with much resolution; but as our distance from the land increased, his feelings suffered exceedingly. The sun set beautifully over his native island, and his eye dwelt steadfastly upon it till darkness concealed it from further view. The recollection of scenes of youthful happiness, which he was leaving to traverse an element that affords but little of pleasure or repose , frequently brought the big tear into his eye...For several days following Moyhanger looked anxiously to the westward, the direction in which his native land had disappeared..." The HMS Ferret sailed westward, below Cape Horn, before stopping at Saint Helena to replenish supplies. Moehanga was supposedly disappointed with the snow-covered peaks of Cape Horn, considering them infertile and sterile for agricultural use. Savage wrote, "They [the Māori] estimate the value of land by the quantity of potatoes it produces, and as there were no signs of cultivation here, Moyhanger was very glad to turn his back upon it..."

Time in London 
 
While in London, Moehanga may have stayed with John Savage at Fludyer Street, a former street overtaken by the modern-day Foreign and Commonwealth Office, Whitehall, London. He was the first person to arrive in London bearing Tā moko, or facial tattoos, traditionally practiced by the Māori of New Zealand.

Moehanga visited the fourth Earl Fitzwilliam, William Fitzwilliam, at his Grosvenor Square residence. Also there that night was Lord Milton, the future fifth Earl Fitzwilliam. Savage wrote of the meeting between Moehanga and the fourth Earl Fitzwilliam, "He [Moehanga] was a great physiognomist, and approved or disliked at a first interview. The lines of his lordship's face pleased him more than those of any man of whom I had yet heard his opinion." Savage may have written in this way because the Earl Fitzwilliam was a patron.  

A marble bust of William Fitzwilliam caught Moehanga's attention, and he is said to have contemplated its features with great admiration, promising to carve an imitation upon his return to New Zealand. 

The ornamental furnishings of the Earl's Grosvenor Square residence did not impress Moehanga, instead he placed value on the number of chairs, observing, "A great number of men sit with the chief."  

Savage wrote that it was "extremely inconvenient" to take Moehanga to public exhibitions, or even on the streets, on account of "John Bull's curiosity." Savage did take him to St. Paul's Cathedral, which "appeared to astonish him".  

Moehanga did not enjoy the noise of the London streets; he regularly exclaimed Kiooda tungata, or kiooda wyeena nue une mum mum mum, which translates as 'Bad man or woman to make such a noise.' Moehanga was conveniently returned to New Zealand under the care of Captain Skelton, possibly cutting short his London stay. Savage wrote of his return to New Zealand,  "The ample stock of tools he took with him would render him superior, in point of riches, to any man in New Zealand; and there is not a doubt but the example of his success will induce many of his countrymen to try their fortune, whenever an opportunity for emigration may offer...he held my hand at taking leave a considerable time, during the whole of which he wept, and appeared to suffer exceedingly."

Later life 
Sources differ over Moehanga's reception upon his return to his native tribe in New Zealand. 

Savage hinted throughout his account that Moehanga often thought of revenge on rival tribes in New Zealand. A piece from the October 1807 edition of the Eclectic Review suggested that Moehanga was determined - obsessed even - to seek revenge on Orootookee, a chief of a neighbouring tribe who had wounded him.

An account by Peter Dillon, in his 1829 Narrative and Successful Result of a Voyage in the South Seas, describes a meeting between Moehanga and Dillon. More than twenty years after travelling to London with John Savage, Moehanga falsely recalls meeting King George III and Queen Charlotte, as well as their son, the then Prince Regent. Moehanga also claimed to Dillon that he used money received from Queen Charlotte to hire a prostitute, whom he supposedly got pregnant. He then goes on to suppose he returned to New Zealand via India on board the HMS Porpoise. Historian Vincent O'Malley has researched these claims and found no supporting evidence, noting that Moehanga arrived in London on 27 April, and departed on 20 June - a very brief visit - making some of his claims untenable.

Legacy 
On 30 April 2021, New Zealanders acknowledged Moehanga Day - or the day the Māori "discovered" Britain. Deputy Labour leader and the first Minister for Māori–Crown Relations, Kelvin Davis, said, "The day that Māori discovered England...It's got a great twist to it. I like it." He added, "This is all part of history that we should be talking about and celebrating. If it's celebrating some of our Ngāpuhi ancestors, then why not?"

References

Further reading 
 Anon, 1807, 'Savage's Account of New Zealand, The Eclectic Review, October, p. 867-75. 
 Anon, 1806, "Ship News", The Morning Post, 29 April. p. 4.
 Anon, 1807, 'Wednesday and Thursday's Post', Jackson's Oxford Journal, 20 June, p. 2. 
 Craw, G. (2012) Moehanga becomes first Māori to visit England. NZ History. (https://nzhistory.govt.nz/moehanga-becomes-first-maori-visit-england). 
 Dillon, P. (1829) Narrative and Successful Result of a Voyage in the South Seas. London: Chance Hurst.
 Marsden, S. (1814) Journal: Reverend Samuel Marsden's First Visit to New Zealand in December 1814. Available online at: www.marsdenarchive.otago.ac.nz/ MS_0176_001#page/1/mode/1up.
 McClymont, W.G. (1940) The Exploration of New Zealand. Wellington: Department of Internal Affairs. Accessible via: http://nzetc.victoria.ac.nz/tm/scholarly/tei-McCExpl.html. 
 McCormick, E. H. (1940) Letters and Art in New Zealand. Wellington: Department of Internal Affairs. 
 McNab, R. (1914) From Tasman to Marsden: A History of Northern New Zealand from 1642 to 1818. Dunedin: J. Wilkie and Co. 
 Nicholas, J. L. (1817) Narrative of a Voyage to New Zealand. London: James Black and Son. 
 O'Malley, V. (2015) Haerenga: Early Maori Journeys Across the Globe. Wellington: Bridget Williams Books. 
 O'Malley, V. (2012) The Meeting Place: Maori and Pakeha Encounters. 1642-1850. Auckland: Auckland University Press. 
 Robley, H.G. (1896) Moko; or Maori Tatooing. London: Chapman and Hall. Accessible via: http://nzetc.victoria.ac.nz/tm/scholarly/tei-RobMoko.html. 
 Savage, J. (1807) Some Account of New Zealand: Particularly the Bay of Islands, and Surrounding Country. London: J. Murray; Edinburgh: A. Constable and Co. Accessible via: https://play.google.com/store/books/details?id=59oNAAAAQAAJ&hl=en. 
Salmond, A. (1998) Between Worlds: Early Exchanges Between Maori and Europeans, 1773-1815. Hawaii: University of Hawaii Press. 
 Sherrin, R.A.A. and Wallace, J.H. (1890) Early History of New Zealand: From Earliest Times to 1840. Auckland: H. Brett. 
 Sinclair, K. (1988) A History of New Zealand. (4th edn.) Auckland: Penguin Books. 
 Thrush, C. (2016) Indigenous London: Native Travelers at the Heart of Empire. New Haven, CT.: Yale University Press. 
 Walrond, C. (2005) 'Māori overseas—18th- and 19th-century travellers', Dictionary of New Zealand Biography: Te Ara—the Encyclopedia of New Zealand. Available at: www.teara.govt.nz/en/maori-overseas/page-1. 
 Wilson, O. (1963) Maori and Pakeha. The Journal of the Polynesian Society. (Vol. 72, No. 1) pp. 11-20.

Ngāpuhi people

Date of death missing
Year of birth missing